Petr Váša (born 7 February 1965 in Brno, Czechoslovakia) is a Czech poet, rock singer-songwriter, experimental actor, artist and educator. In 1985 he founded his first band called Z kopce (Czech "downhill"). From 1999 he performed with Ty Syčáci. He is also member of the rock band Jasná Páka.

Bibliography
1994 Texty, básně, poémes physiques
2005 Návrat Plavce Jindřicha
2011 Fyzické básnictví (with DVD)

Discography
1998 Cirkus-Chaos-Minaret (Wolf Records)
2000 Máj v dubnu (Indies Records)
2001 Lék a jed (Indies Records)
2002 SSSS...' (Indies Records)
2005 Lišák je lišák (Indies Records)
2006 Fysipos (live 2006, recorded at experimental theater Alfred ve dvoře)
2007 Manifesto (Black Point Music)
2007 Bum bum bum2010 KrásaFilmography
2009 Men in Rut''

References

External links

Official website
Ty Syčáci's Official website
Petr Váša at ČSFD.cz
Petr Váša at National Library of the Czech Republic

1965 births
Living people
Czech artists
Czech poets
Czech male poets
20th-century Czech male singers
Czech songwriters
Czech academics
21st-century Czech male singers